Bohdan Przywarski (12 April 1932 – 21 October 2013) was a Polish basketball player. He competed in the men's tournament at the 1960 Summer Olympics. He coached the Morocco national team.

References

1932 births
2013 deaths
Polish men's basketball players
Olympic basketball players of Poland
Basketball players at the 1960 Summer Olympics
People from Braslaw District
People from Wilno Voivodeship (1926–1939)